Shaft is a double album by Isaac Hayes, recorded for Stax Records' Enterprise label as the soundtrack LP for Metro-Goldwyn-Mayer's 1971 blaxploitation film  Shaft. The album mostly consists of instrumentals composed by Hayes as score for the film. Three vocal selections are included: "Soulsville", "Do Your Thing", and "Theme from Shaft". A commercial and critical success, Shaft is Hayes' best-known work and the best-selling LP ever released on a Stax label.

In 2014, the album was added to the National Recording Registry by the Library of Congress for being "culturally, historically, or aesthetically significant."

Conception
Hayes initially became involved with Shaft in hopes of having director Gordon Parks cast him in the title role, because he was not aware that Richard Roundtree had already been cast as John Shaft. Hayes did appear in the film in a cameo role, but, more significantly, composed the film's score. While the film was still in production, Parks sent Hayes raw footage of some of the film's scenes, and Hayes wrote three pieces for the scenes: "Theme from Shaft" for the opening title sequence, "Soulsville" for a scene in which Shaft walks through Harlem, and "Ellie's Love Theme" for a love scene.

Pleased with the results, MGM hired Hayes to compose the rest of the score, and Hayes spent two months working between tour dates on the score at the MGM studio. Once the score was composed and arranged, Hayes recorded the rhythm tracks with Stax band The Bar-Kays in one day. The orchestral tracks were recorded the next day, and the vocals the day after that. The songs were later re-recorded for the album at Stax Studios and slightly rearranged from their film versions: MGM's recording facility was based upon a three-track system, and Hayes wanted a richer sound for the album).

Reception

Upon its release in the summer of 1971, Shaft became the first double album of original studio material released by an R&B artist. The album peaked at number one on The Billboard 200 chart, and spent sixty weeks on the chart. It took the top position on the Top R&B Albums chart for 14 weeks. It achieved Platinum status within a month of its release. Both "Theme from Shaft" and "Do Your Thing" became Top 40 singles on the Billboard Hot 100 chart, with the former peaking at number one.

At the 1972 Grammy Awards, "Theme from Shaft" won the awards for Best Engineered Recording, Non-Classical and Best Instrumental Arrangement. The film score as a whole won for Best Instrumental Composition Written Specifically For A Motion Picture or for Television. The National Association of Television and Radio Announcers gave Shaft its Album of the Year award. At the Academy Awards that year, Hayes became the first African-American to win an Oscar for a non-acting category when "Theme from Shaft" won the award for Best Original Song. Isaac Hayes was nominated for Original Dramatic Score as well, losing to Michel Legrand for the score to Summer of '42.

In a 2020 retrospective on the Shaft franchise, RetroFan stated that "Hayes' score helped change the way music was used in film, bringing in a more contemporary, funk/soul-driven sound. It had an especially significant impact on the coming wave of black films, setting the standard for how R&B music would be used in films, and marketed alongside of individual movies."

The 2009 re-release of the soundtrack on CD by Stax Records added an additional track, "Theme from Shaft" (2009 Mix), timed at 4:45.

Track listing

All songs written and produced by Isaac Hayes.

Side one
"Theme from Shaft" (Vocal Version)  – 4:39
"Bumpy's Lament"  – 1:51
"Walk from Regio's"  – 2:24
"Ellie's Love Theme"  – 3:18
"Shaft's Cab Ride"  – 1:10

Side two
"Cafe Regio's"  – 6:10
"Early Sunday Morning"  – 3:49
"Be Yourself"  – 4:30
"A Friend's Place"  – 3:24

Side three
"Soulsville" (Vocal Version)  – 3:48
"No Name Bar"  – 6:11
"Bumpy's Blues"  – 4:04
"Shaft Strikes Again"  – 3:04

Side four
"Do Your Thing" (Vocal Version)  – 19:30
"The End Theme"  – 1:56

Personnel
Lead vocals (tracks A1, C1, D1), keyboards (All tracks), and lyrics (A1, C1, D1) : Isaac Hayes
 Rhythm, Horns and Strings arranged by Johnny Allen (tracks A1-A2, A4-D2), J. J. Johnson (A3), and Isaac Hayes (All tracks)
Backing vocals by Pat Lewis, Rose Williams, and Telma Hopkins (tracks A1, C1, D1)
Instrumentation by The Bar-Kays and The Isaac Hayes Movement
Electric piano by Lester Snell
Bass guitar by James Alexander
Guitar by Charles Pitts
Guitar by Michael Toles
Drums by Willie Hall
Conga, and Bongo drums by Gary Jones
Lead Trumpet by Richard "Johnny" Davis
Flute by John Fonville

Awards and charts

Billboard charts

Album

Singles

"Do Your Thing" was also a Top 40 Pop Single

Grammy Awards
Shaft
Best Instrumental Composition Written Specifically For A Motion Picture or for Television (Isaac Hayes)
Theme from Shaft
Best Engineered Recording, Non-Classical (Dave Purple, Henry Bush, Ron Capone)
Best Instrumental Arrangement (Isaac Hayes, Johnny Allen)

Academy Awards
Theme from Shaft
Best Original Song - Theme From Shaft (Isaac Hayes)

See also
List of number-one albums of 1971 (U.S.)
List of number-one R&B albums of 1971 (U.S.)

Footnotes

Isaac Hayes soundtracks
Shaft (franchise)
Albums produced by Isaac Hayes
1971 soundtrack albums
1970s film soundtrack albums
Stax Records soundtracks
United States National Recording Registry recordings
Action film soundtracks
United States National Recording Registry albums